Jonathan Dakin (born 28 February 1973) was an English first-class cricketer who played for Essex and Leicestershire between 1993 and 2004. He was born in Hitchin, Hertfordshire.

References

External links

1973 births
English cricketers
Essex cricketers
Leicestershire cricketers
Living people
21st-century English people
Sportspeople from Hitchin